Romneya trichocalyx, the bristly Matilija poppy or hairy Matilija poppy, is a species of flowering plant in the poppy family. This poppy is native to San Diego, Ventura, and Santa Barbara counties in California, as well as Baja California, Mexico, where it grows in dry canyons in chaparral and coastal sage scrub plant communities. Like its relative Romneya coulteri, it is used as an ornamental plant, kept for its large, showy flowers.

The gray-green leaves are each divided into a few lance-shaped lobes. At the center of the flower is a cluster of many yellow stamens.

It is distinguished from R. coulteri by its hairy sepals and smaller flowers and fruits. In the past the two species were placed in synonymy, but they are currently regarded as distinct by California botanists.

It is named after Irish astronomer John Thomas Romney Robinson.

References

External links
Photo gallery

Papaveroideae
Flora of Baja California
Flora of California
Garden plants
Flora without expected TNC conservation status